Naked Eyes are an English new wave band that rose to prominence in the early 1980s. The band had four US top 40 singles.

The group's first hit, "Always Something There to Remind Me", was a cover of the Burt Bacharach/Hal David standard. The band had subsequent hits with more of their own compositions, "Promises, Promises", "When the Lights Go Out", and "(What) In the Name of Love".

History
Naked Eyes was formed by Pete Byrne and Rob Fisher. The two had formerly been part of a band called Neon, with future members of Tears for Fears.

Naked Eyes were one of the first bands to make significant use of the Fairlight CMI sampling synthesizer on a recording.

The debut album Burning Bridges was produced by Tony Mansfield, along with the follow-up album Fuel for the Fire, which also featured two titles produced by Arthur Baker. Their second and third singles, "Promises, Promises" (the 12" mix of which features vocals from Madonna) and "When the Lights Go Out", were also hit singles in the United States.

Following the release of the band's second album, Byrne moved to California. He performed on Stevie Wonder's "Part-Time Lover", sang backgrounds with Rita Coolidge and Princess Stephanie, and wrote and produced for the Olsen twins. Fisher also explored other projects, doing sessions in London and forming Climie Fisher with Simon Climie.

The group never toured due to the technical difficulties of recreating their studio sound in concert. 

Rob Fisher died on 25 August 1999, age 42, following surgery for bowel cancer.

Byrne released a solo album The Real Illusion in 2001, which featured some of the last tracks he wrote with Fisher for a proposed third Naked Eyes album. In 2005, Byrne put a band together to play Naked Eyes shows, and has been touring regularly since. In 2007, Naked Eyes released Fumbling with the Covers, an acoustic album which consisted of covers of Bob Dylan, The Beatles and Elvis Costello, among others, along with the Naked Eyes hits.

In the summer of 2008, Naked Eyes completed a US tour along with Belinda Carlisle, ABC and the Human League. Naked Eyes did a US tour with the Go-Go's, Scandal and the Motels in 2014 and has been touring each summer since; Naked Eyes' 2020 tour was postponed to 2021 due to COVID-19 related restrictions.

On 8 June 2021, Naked Eyes released its latest album, Disguise the Limit.

Discography

Studio albums
Burning Bridges (1983) US #32, AUS #88 (self-titled in the US & Canada, with modified track listing and different cover artwork)
Fuel for the Fire (1984) US #83
Fumbling with the Covers (2007)
Disguise the Limit (2021)

Compilation albums
The Best of Naked Eyes (1991)
Promises, Promises (The Very Best of Naked Eyes) (1994)
Naked Eyes / Spandau Ballet – Back 2 Back Hits (1998)
Everything and More (2002)

Singles

Music videos
 "Always Something There to Remind Me" (1982)
 "Promises, Promises" (1983)
 "Voices in My Head" (1983)
 "When the Lights Go Out" (1983)
 "(What) In the Name of Love" (1984)
 "Cry Baby Cry" (2007)

References

External links

Naked Eyes discography
Q&A with the Naked Eyes' Pete Byrne John Hood for the Miami New Times 6 July 2009
A Chat with Pete Byrne, 2008

English pop rock music groups
English new wave musical groups
English synth-pop groups
English musical duos
British synth-pop new wave groups
Male musical duos
New wave duos
Musical groups established in 1982
1982 establishments in England
Musical groups from Somerset
Second British Invasion artists